The Order of Friars Minor Conventual (OFM Conv) is a male religious fraternity in the Roman Catholic Church that is a branch of the Franciscans.  The friars in OFM CONV are also known as Conventual Franciscans, or Minorites.

Dating back to the 13th century, OFM Conv. has provinces worldwide. Dressed in serge habits with white cords, the friars teach in schools, serve as chaplains, run hospitals and provide aid to the poor.

Background

The OFM Conv. is a mendicant Catholic religious order. It is one of three separate fraternities that make up the First Order of St. Francis, for friars only. The Second Order is the Poor Clares, for nuns only.  The Third Order can be for men or women, secular or religious.

Source of the name 
There are several theories as to the source of the name "conventual":

 In the Bull Cum tamquam veri of 5 April 1250, Pope Innocent IV decreed that Franciscan churches where convents existed might be called "Conventual churches".
 A second theory is that the name was given to the friars living in Conventual convents. 
 A third view is that the Latin word conventualis was used to distinguish the friars of large convents from friars who lived solitary lives like hermits.

Today the term "convent" denotes a residence for nuns; however, its original meaning meant residences for either men or women.

Friar versus monk 
A friar is not the same as a monk. Both take the evangelical counsels (vows of poverty, chastity, and obedience).

 The monk chooses a life of cloistered asceticism while the friar chooses a life of service  in society. For the friar, the exercise of public ministry is an essential feature, for which the life of the cloister is considered as but an immediate preparation.
 The monk lives in a self-sufficient community, while the friar works among laypeople.  The friar receives donations or other charitable support initially.
 The monk often takes an vow of "stability", committing himself to one community in one place. The friar commits to a community spread across a province.  He will move to different houses of the community within his province.

Current status 
OFM Conv. includes 30 provinces, 18 custodies, 460 friaries and 4048 friars worldwide as of August 2018. There are four provinces in the United States. Friars serve in parishes, schools, and as chaplains for the military and for other religious orders; they serve in various types of homes and shelters, and with Catholic Relief Services. Particular characteristics of the Conventuals' tradition are community life and the urban apostolate.

The Conventuals enjoy the privilege of caring for the tomb of St. Francis at Assisi and that of St. Anthony at the Basilica in Padua, and they furnish the penitentiaries to the Basilica of St. Peter in Rome.

Habit 
The OFM Conv. habit consists of a tunic fastened around the waist with a thin white cord, along with a large cape which is round in front and pointed behind with a small hood attached. The color may be either black, which was adopted during the French Revolution, dark grey, or light grey which is worn by friars in East Africa.

History
The original friars of OFM-Conv. sought to spread the ideals of Saint Francis throughout the new urban social order of the Middle Ages. Some friars settled in the urban slums, or the suburbs of the medieval neighbourhoods where the huts and shacks of the poorest were built outside the safety of the city walls. In London, the first settlement of the friars was set in what was called "Stinking Lane".

Since the suburbs were also the place where hospitals were set up, the friars were often commissioned by the city government to facilitate the care of the sick. The friars also helped to construct sturdier buildings, replacing the previous huts, and constructed churches. Robert Grosseteste, then Bishop of Lincoln, marvelled that the people "run to the friars for instruction as well as for confession and direction. They are transforming the world."

Rule of poverty 
As the Franciscan Order became increasingly centered in larger communities (“convents”) and engaged in pastoral work there, many friars started questioning the utility of the vow of poverty.  The literal and unconditional observance of poverty came to appear impracticable by the great expansion of the order, its pursuit of learning, and the accumulated property of the large cloisters in the towns. Some friars favored a relaxation in the rigor of the rule, especially as regards the observance of poverty.  In contrast, other friars wanted to maintain a literal interpretation of the rule.

The "Friars of the Community" sought to take Francis's ideals to the far reaches of a universal Church. After the founder's death, they began the task of translating Francis's earthly existence into what they saw as a more socially relevant spiritual message for current and future generations. The Conventual Franciscans nestled their large group homes into small areas of land surrounded by poverty. They used their abilities to combat the hardships and injustices of the poverty-stricken areas where they settled.

After the death of Francis in 1226, his successor Brother Elias encouraged more leniency in the rule of poverty. A long dispute followed in which the “Friars of the Community”, who had adopted certain mitigations, gradually came to be called Conventuals.  Friars who zealously supported strict observance were called Zelanti, and later Observants.

After the death of the Minister General, Bonaventure, in 1274, the Order grew even more divided.  The Conventuals received papal dispensations, or permissions, to build their communities in the cities in order to preach the Gospel and serve the poor.  The Observants followed absolute poverty and the eremitical and ascetical dimensions of Franciscanism.

Establishment of two fraternities 
In 1517, Pope Leo X called a meeting of the entire Franciscan Order in Rome to end this dispute about the vow of poverty and reunite the two factions. The Observants agreed to a union, but demanded that the entire order observe the vow of poverty without any dispensation.  The Conventuals said they would not agree to any union that would require them to give up their dispensations.

Recognizing the impasse, Leo X decided to officially divide the two factions into separate fraternities

 Leo incorporated all the Franciscan friars who wished to observe the rule of poverty without dispensation as the Friars Minor of St. Francis, or Friars Minor of the Regular Observance.  They would have precedence over the Conventuals; he moreover conferred upon the Friars Minor the right of electing  Minister General of the Whole Order of Friars Minor. 
 Those friars who wanted to live under dispensations were constituted a separate body with the name of Conventuals (Bulls Omnipotens Deus, 12 June 1517, and Licet Alias, 6 Dec. 1517) and given the right to elect a master general of their own, whose election, however, had to be confirmed by the Minister General of the Friars Minor. The latter appears never to have availed himself of this right, and the Conventuals may be regarded as an entirely independent order from 1517, but it was not until 1580 that they obtained a special cardinal protector of their own.

Constitutiones Urbanæ 
In 1565 the Conventuals accepted the Tridentine indult allowing mendicant orders to own property corporately, and their chapter held at Florence in that year drew up statutes containing several important reforms which Pope Pius IV subsequently approved. In 1625 new constitutions were adopted by the Conventuals which superseded all preceding ones.

These constitutions, which were subsequently promulgated by Pope Urban VIII, are known as the "Constitutiones Urbanæ" and are of importance, since at their profession the Conventuals then vowed to observe the Rule of St. Francis in accordance with them, that is to say, by admitting the duly authorized dispensations therein set forth. In 1897, Pope Leo XIII reorganized the Franciscan Orders, giving each its own Minister General.  The Urban Constitutions remained in force until 1932, when they were revised and replaced.  A further substantive revision occurred in 1984, following the Second Vatican Council.  The Constitutions were revised again in 2019, which remains the current version.

Notable members of the order

Saints
 Saint Peter de Regalado (1390–1456)
 Saint John of Dukla (1414–1484)
 Saint Joseph of Cupertino (1603–1663)
 Saint Francis Fasani (1681–1742)
 Saint Maximilian Kolbe (1894–1941)

Blesseds
 Albert Berdini of Sarteano (1385–1450)
 Francesco Zirano (1565–1603)
 Antonio Lucci (1682–1752)
 Bonaventure of Potenza (1651–1711)
 Antonin Bajewski (1915–1941)
 Michał Tomaszek (1960–1991)
 Carlos de Dios Murias (d. 1976)
 Zbigniew Strzałkowski (1958–1991)

Venerables
 Quirico Pignalberi (1891–1982)

Servants of God
 Nicolò Cortese (1907–1944)
 Michael Jerome Cypher (1941–1975)

Popes
 Pope Sixtus IV (1414–1484)
 Pope Sixtus V (1521–1490)
 Pope Clement XIV (1705–1774)

Scholars
 Simon Tunsted (d. 1369)
 Nicholas of Freising
 Cornelio Musso (1511–1574)
 Girolamo Diruta
 Mario di Calasio (1550–1620)
 Philip Faber (1564–1630)
 Matthew Ferchi (1583–1669)
 Andrea di Castellana (Scalimoli)
 Bartholomew Mastrius (1602–1673)
 Francesco Lorenzo Brancati di Lauria (1612–1693)
 Antoine Pagi (1624–1699)
 Vincenzo Coronelli (1650–1718)
 François Pagi (1654–1721)
 Giovanni Battista Martini (1706–1784)
 Stanislao Mattei (1750–1825)
 Nicholas Papini (1751–1834)
 Maria Antonio of Vicenza (1834–1884)
 Thomas Grassmann (1890–1970)
 Celestin Tomić (1917–2006)
 Charles Madden (author of a book on Freemasonry)

References

Sources
Ordo Fratrum Minorum Conventualium - Conventual Franciscans
Conventual Franciscan Friars in the United States

External links

Friars Minor Conventual in Uganda Greyfriars in Uganda
Conventual Franciscans in Wrocław, Poland History with pictures
VIDEO: OFM Conv - Ordo Fratrum Minorum Conventualium OFM Conv - Ordo Fratrum Minorum Conventualium

 
1209 establishments in Europe
Religious organizations established in the 1200s
Christian religious orders established in the 13th century
Conventual Franciscan bishops